The Estonian Land Forces, unofficially referred to as the Estonian Army, is the name of the unified ground forces among the Estonian Defense Forces where it has an offensive military formation role. It is currently the largest Estonian military branch with the average size during peacetime of approximately 6,000 soldiers, conscripts, and officers.

The Maavägi development priorities are the capability to participate in missions outside the national territory and the capability to perform operations to protect the territory of Estonia, also in co-operation with the Allies. The Maavägi component of the operational structure consists of an infantry brigade and a homeland security structure. Deployable infantry battalion tactical group and some deployable CS, CSS units will developed in the Army structure in accordance with NATO Force Proposals requirements. Infantry brigade will act as a training and support frame for deployable units. Homeland security structure units will have the capability to carry out territorial military tasks and support civil structures.

The Land Forces are structured according to the principle of a reserve force which means that the main part of the defense forces of the state are units in a trained reserve. For a state with few human and economic resources, a reserve force based on the will of defense of the citizens is the only viable form of national defense.

In peacetime the reservists conduct normal lives and the state takes care of their training and the procurement of equipment and weapons. In wartime the reservists are mobilized into military units. The reserve units are formed on the territorial principle, i.e. conscripts from one area are called up at one time to one unit and after service they are sent to the reserve as one unit. The Estonian army is always in constant defense readiness in co-operation with the other services.

History 
The 1st and 2nd Divisions were created during the Estonian War of Independence; the 2nd Division in December 1918 and January 1919. The Scouts Single Infantry Battalion was formed on 21 December 1918.

On 21 November 1928, eight 'Single Infantry Battalions' were created. The peacetime purpose of these battalions was to train conscripts. In wartime the battalion would reorganize itself into a regiment with a similar order of battle as the two initial reaction force regiments covering the eastern and southern borders. Each battalion's peacetime strength was a total 237 soldiers, in a regimental staff, a Signal Platoon, an Engineering Platoon, a Ski-Bicycle Platoon, a Building Platoon, and three infantry companies.

The wartime order of battle would have transformed the battalion into a regiment size unit carrying the same unit number and would have included 3 infantry battalions, Signal Company, Engineering Company, Ski-Bicycle Company, Cavalry Company, Building Company, Commandant Commando and a CB Commando. In total of 3,153 men.

The 2nd Single Infantry Battalion was located at Tartu; the 3rd Single Infantry Battalion was located at Valga; the 4th at Jõhvi; the 5th at Rakvere; the 6th Single Infantry Battalion was located at Pärnu; the 8th Single Infantry Battalion at Valga; the 9th at Pärnu; and the 10th Single Infantry Battalion was located at Tallinn.

A reorganisation took place on 1 February 1940 and a fourth division was created. The 4th Division staff was based in Viljandi. The division was made up by the Pärnu-Viljandi Military District and Valga Military District. The division's commander was Colonel Jaan Maide. The four divisions were active until the Soviet occupation of Estonia.

On 17 August 1940, after Estonia occupation by the Soviets, the 22nd Territorial Rifle Corps of the Red Army was formed at Tallinn. It was created as a territorial Estonian body on the basis of military units and institutions of the Estonian army. All soldiers and officers kept the Estonian army 1936-spec uniforms, on which were sewn Soviet insignia. The first commander of the 22nd Territorial Rifle Corps was a former major general of the Estonian army, Gustav Jonson, who was later arrested by the NKVD and shot. Initially, most of the corps' officer posts were occupied by former officers of the Estonian army, but by the middle of June 1941 – even before the German invasion of the Soviet Union – most of them were arrested and replaced by newcomers from the Soviet Red Army officers.

Many of the Estonian officers of the 22nd Territorial Rifle Corps body were arrested and died in 1941 and 1942 in camps in the Soviet Union; many were shot. The former commander of the 180th Rifle Division, 22nd Corps, Richard Tomberg, survived after dismissal only because from 1942 he was claimed by the Frunze Military Academy as a teacher. He was arrested in February 1944 (he was released from the camp and rehabilitated in 1956). Some officers of the 22nd Rifle Corps, among whom was Alfons Rebane, managed to escape from the authorities in the period between the dismissal of the army and the plan for their arrest. Someone managed to escape abroad, others came out of hiding only after the arrival of German troops in July and August 1941, some of them volunteered for the Estonian units that fought on the side of Nazi Germany, or to enlist in the Estonian organisations controlled by the German authorities.

The 22nd Territorial Rifle Corps was part of the 'operational army' during World War II from 22 June 1941 to 31 August 1941. On 22 June 1941 the corps headquarters was stationed in village of Rev.

Organization

Military units

Fire and maneuver team
The fire and maneuver team is a very small Estonian military unit led by a soldier that is subordinate to an infantry fireteam. The fire and maneuver team is bigger than an individual soldier but smaller than a fireteam. It is also the smallest military formation among the Estonian Ground Force infantry units.

It usually consists of two soldiers. A fire and maneuver team is led by the more experienced soldier in the team.

One fire and maneuver team is meant to operate on a battlefield along with other fire and maneuver teams on a landscale not greater than 20 x 50 metres. There are no logistical support elements in the structure of a fire and maneuver team.

Fireteam

A fireteam is a small military unit led by a senior soldier that is subordinate to an infantry squad. A fire team is bigger than a fire and maneuver team but smaller than a squad. It is also one of the smallest military formation among the Estonian Ground Force infantry units.

It usually consists of three to five soldiers, and may be further subdivided into fire and maneuver teams. A fireteam is composed of two fire and maneuver teams of two soldiers each, as well as a fireteam leader who is usually a corporal.

One fireteam is meant to operate on a battlefield along with other fireteams on a landscale not greater than 50 x 100 metres. There are no logistical support elements in the structure of a fireteam.

Squad
A squad is a small military unit led by a non-commissioned officer (NCO) that is subordinate to an infantry platoon. A squad is bigger than a fireteam but smaller than a platoon. It is also one of the smallest military formation among the Estonian Ground Force infantry units.

It usually consists six to ten soldiers, and may be further subdivided into fireteams. A squad is composed of two fireteams of five soldiers each, as well as a squad leader (in Defence League ) who is usually a sergeant. His second in command is known as an assistant squad leader ('; in Defence League ).

One squad is meant to operate on a battlefield along with other squads on a landscale not greater than 100 x 200 metres. There are no logistical support elements in the structure of a squad. The formation transport is usually made up by one tactical transport vehicle such as Mercedes-Benz Unimog 435.

Platoon
A platoon is a small military unit led by an officer (NCO) that is subordinate to an infantry company. A platoon is bigger than a squad but smaller than a company. It is also one of the smallest military formations among the Estonian Ground Force infantry units.

It usually consists thirty to fifty soldiers, and is further subdivided into squads. A platoon is composed of five squads of ten soldiers each, as well as a platoon leader (in Defence League ) who is usually a junior lieutenant. His second in command is known as a platoon sergeant (in Defence League ).

One platoon is meant to operate on a battlefield along with other platoons on a landscale not greater than 300 × 400 metres. There is no logistical support element in the structure of a platoon. The formation transport is usually made up by three to five tactical transport vehicles such as Mercedes-Benz UNIMOG 435.

Company
A company is a medium military unit led by a junior officer that is subordinate to an infantry battalion. A company is bigger than a platoon but smaller than a battalion. It is one of the most basic military formation among the Estonian Ground Force infantry units.

It usually consists 180 to 250 soldiers, and is further subdivided into platoons. A company is composed of five platoons of thirty to fifty soldiers each, as well as a company leader who is usually a captain. His second in command is lieutenant as an assistant of the battalion.

One company is meant to operate on a battlefield along with other companies on a landscale not greater than 500 x 500 metres. There is a logistical support element in the structure of a company which is based on a reserve platoon. The formation transport is usually made up by twenty tactical transport vehicles such as Mercedes-Benz Unimog 435.

Battalion
A battalion is an average military unit led by a senior officer that is subordinate to an infantry brigade. A battalion is bigger than a company but smaller than a brigade. It is one of the most basic military formation among the Estonian Ground Force infantry units.

It usually consists of 900 to 1250 soldiers, and is further subdivided into companies. A battalion is composed of five companies of 180 to 250 soldiers each, as well as a company leader who is usually a lieutenant colonel. His second in command is a colonel as an assistant of the battalion.

One battalion is meant to operate on a battlefield along with other battalion on a landscale not greater than 1500 x 3000 metres. There is a logistical support element in the structure of a battalion which is based on a reserve company. The formation transport is usually made up by 200 tactical transport vehicles such as Mercedes-Benz UNIMOG 435.

Brigade
A brigade is commanded by a senior officer that is subordinate to an infantry division. A brigade is bigger than a battalion but smaller than a division. It is currently the largest military structure that the Estonian infantry can field.

An Estonian brigade consists of 5,000 to 8,750 soldiers, and is subdivided into battalions. A brigade is made up of seven battalions of 900 to 1,250 soldiers each, commanded by a Brigade Commander who is usually a colonel. His second in command is a Lieutenant Colonel.

In the future, a brigade will operate on the battlefield alongside other brigades on a sector not greater than 10 x 15 kilometres. There is a logistical support element in the structure of a brigade based on a reserve battalion. The transportation component of an Estonian brigade consists of approximately 1,500 tactical transport vehicles such as the Mercedes-Benz UNIMOG 435.

County brigade

The term malev is historical. It was originally based on the manpower of a county and was led by a county leader. A malev was bigger than a battalion and smaller than a division. It was the largest military formation among the Estonian Defense League infantry units.

A malev is usually a sub-component of a division, a larger unit consisting of two or more malevs; however, some brigades are classified as a separate brigade and operate independently from the traditional division structure. A malevs commanding officer is commonly a major or colonel.

A modern malev is typically composed of three to five companies or battalions, depending on the area and available manpower of a given county. Each malev can operate independently on a battlefield encompassing an area of 10 km × 15 km.

Division
A division is a large military unit led by a general that is subordinate to a corps. The division is bigger than a brigade but smaller than a corps.

It usually consists of 20,000 to 35,000 soldiers, and is further subdivided into brigades. A division is composed of two to four brigades 5000 to 8750 soldiers each, as well as a division leader who is usually a major general. His second in command is a brigadier general as an assistant of the division.

One division is meant to operate on a battlefield along with other divisions on a front which covers more than two counties. There is a logistical support element in the structure of a division which is based on a reserve brigade. The formation transport is usually made up by 5000 to 7000 tactical transport vehicles such as Mercedes-Benz Unimog 435.

 Peacetime structure 

The two brigades are not fully manned in peacetime. The only units fully manned at all times are the two brigade commands, the Scouts Battalion and the EOD/Demining Service. The 2nd Infantry Brigade was activated on 1 August 2014. The brigade will continue to activate further units to reach full strength by 2022 at the latest. In parallel the 1st Infantry Brigade will become a mechanized brigade with tracked infantry fighting vehicles and self-propelled artillery. In wartime the two brigades will be brought to full strength with reserve soldiers. Besides the two Land Force brigades the Estonian Defense Forces also field a large number of smaller light infantry units of the Estonian Defense League, which are tasked with local defense respectively stay-behind operations.

 Defence Forces Commander, in Tallinn
 1st Infantry Brigade, in Tapa
 Headquarters Support and Signal Company, in Tapa
 Scouts Battalion, in Tapa, professional rapid reaction unit armed with CV-90s
 Kalev Infantry Battalion, in Jõhvi
 Viru Infantry Battalion, in Jõhvi
 Artillery Battalion, in Tapa
 Air Defense Battalion, in Tapa
 Engineer Battalion, in Tapa
 Combat Service Support Battalion, in Tapa
 Reconnaissance Company, in Tapa
 Anti-Tank Company, in Jõhvi
 2nd Infantry Brigade''', in Luunja
 Headquarters Support and Signal Company, in Luunja
 Kuperjanov Infantry Battalion, in Võru
 22nd Infantry Battalion (reserve)
 23rd Infantry Battalion (reserve)
 25th Artillery Battalion (reserve)
 Air Defense Battalion (reserve)
 Engineer Battalion (reserve)
 Combat Service Support Battalion, in Võru
 Reconnaissance Company (reserve)
 Anti-Tank Company (reserve)

 Personnel 
Land Forces has more than 2,700 full time soldiers and 3,100 conscripts. There were only 15 women in 2013 in conscript service. Previously there was one fully professional infantry battalion – (Scouts Battalion) in the Land Forces. However, since 2017, the unit also trains conscripts in mechanized infantry role.

Training
Estonian Land Forces organizes Spring Storm (Kevadtorm'') exercises every year. 9,000 soldiers participated in this exercise in 2017.

Ranks

Equipment

Weapons
Although the defense force employs various individual weapons to provide light firepower at short ranges, the standard weapons used by the ground force are the domestically upgraded variants of the 7.62mm AK4 and 5.56mm Galil-AR assault rifles, both of which are scheduled to be replaced by 2021, as well as the 9mm variant of the MP5 submachine gun for special operations force. The primary sidearms are the 9x18mm Makarov PM and the 9x19mm USP semi-automatic pistols. Some units are supplemented with a variety of specialized weapons, including the Galil-ARM and Negev light machine gun, to provide suppressive fire at the fire-team level. Indirect fire is provided by the M-69 and CG M3 grenade launchers. The 18.53mm Benelli-M3T dual-mode shotgun is used for door breaching and close-quarters combat. The domestically produced modification of the 7.62mm M14 selective fire automatic rifle TP2 and Galil-S are used by the snipers, along with the 8.6mm Sako TRG and 12.7mm Hecate II heavy sniper rifles are used long-range marksmen. Hand grenades, fragmentation and smoke grenades along with the grenade launcher systems, such as the HK-GLM and HK-79N, are also used.

The defense force also employs various crew-served weapons to provide medium and heavy firepower at ranges exceeding that of individual weapons. The 7.62mm MG-3 and KSP-58 are the ground force standard medium machine guns. The 12.7mm Browning M2HB heavy machine gun is generally used as a vehicle-mounted machine gun used by motorised infantry. The ground force uses two types of mortar for indirect fire support when heavier artillery may not be appropriate or available. The smallest of these are the 81mm M252, B455 and L16A1 mortars that normally assigned at the infantry company level. At higher echelon, infantry battalions are supported by a section of 120mm M-41D and 2B11 mortars, which are usually employed by motorized units. Fire support for infantry units is mainly provided by towed howitzers, including the lighter 122mm D-30H63 and heavier 155mm FH-70 field howitzers. However, in recent years, Estonia has started to procure increasing numbers of self-propelled artillery vehicles to provide fire support for its increasingly mechanized infantry, reducing the role of towed artillery. Estonia donated at least nine D-30s as well as an unspecified number of FH-70 howitzers to Ukraine as part of its military support to Ukraine's defence against the Russian invasion of 2022.

The ground force uses a variety of shoulder fired missiles, recoilless rifles and anti-tank guided missiles to provide infantry and mechanized units with an anti-armor capability. The 82mm B-300 is a reusable man-portable anti-tank shoulder-fired missile system. The 84mm AT4 is an unguided projectile that can destroy armor and bunkers at ranges up to 500 meters. The 90mm C90-CR is a disposable, shoulder-fired and one-man operated grenade launcher. Some motorized units are supported by Pvpj 1110 and M40-A1 recoilless rifles that are mounted on high-mobility utility vehicles. The 115mm MILAN-2 with the night-firing ability and 148mm MAPATS laser-beam riding anti-tank guided missiles are the ground forces' main anti-tank weapon systems. The purchase of the 127mm FGM-148 Javelin fire-and-forget anti-tank missiles will increase the ground forces' anti-armor units capabilities. The 90mm Mistral is an infrared homing surface-to-air missile, which along with the 23mm ZU-23-2 twin-barreled anti-aircraft cannons mounted on trucks make up the backbone of the defense forces' air defense.

Vehicles
The ground force currently does not operate any main battle tanks although some types were in service of the ground force till the Soviet occupation in 1940. In recent years the Estonian MoD has indicated a need to obtain main battle tanks by 2020 according to the national defense development plan. As 2014, the infantry fighting vehicle CV9035 is the ground force's main battle and frontline troop carrier vehicle, is fitted with a 35mm autocannon turret, and carries up to 8 fully equipped soldiers. The ground force's most common armored vehicles are the Pasi series armored personnel carriers of which some have been fitted into ambulance and command post vehicles roles. The similar Pasi 180 and Pasi 188 armored personnel carriers are the standard troop carrier vehicles of the ground forces.  The Pasi XA-180's, which were acquired first, have also been used by the defense forces expeditionary units on peacekeeping operations in Central Asia and Africa. In recent years BTR-80 amphibious armored personnel carriers have been used as training vehicles and are now being phased out.

The Estonian MoD has signed contracts for the procurement of 36 K9 Thunder self-propelled howitzers from South Korea, 18 of which had been delivered by December 2022, with the rest scheduled to arrive by 2026 at the latest. This is in line with the strategy to transform the 1st Infantry Brigade into a mechanized brigade. In response to the Russian invasion of Ukraine, Estonia also signed a contract with the United States for the procurement of six HIMARS multiple launch rocket systems, which are set to be delivered by end of 2024. While the ground force do not have any utility helicopters, attack helicopters or aircraft of its own, it does operate several types of unmanned aerial vehicles and rotorcrafts. Currently there are no operational armed drones in service of the ground force. In 2014, the Estonian MoD announced that Estonia, along with 12 other NATO members, plans to purchase Global Hawk drone to increase its military reconnaissance capabilities.

The defense force's most common vehicles are the Unimog and DAF series general-purpose trucks and light utility vehicles such as Unimog 416, Unimog 435, DAF YA4440, and MB 250GD. There are also variety of different MAN and Sisu built military logistics vehicles, such as MAN 4520, 4620, 4640, KAT1, and Sisu E13TP, in use of the ground force, which are capable of serving as a cargo/troop carrier, artillery tractors, weapons platform and ambulance, among other roles.

Uniforms
The ESTDCU, is the Estonian version of the digital camouflage uniform and its various patterns are designed for use in woodland, desert, urban and winter warfare environments. Soldiers of Estonian Land Force also get the PASGT combat helmet and ballistic vest and a night vision device.

Defense development plan

What follows is a partial list of planned and ongoing equipment procurements for the Land Forces:

Small arms and light weapons
Assault rifles: 19,000 LMT R20 Rahe rifles purchased in 2019. All units to equipped with the new rifle by 2022.
Machine guns: new machine guns to be procured between 2021 and 2024.
Sniper rifles: new sniper rifles to be procured between 2021 and 2024.
Armored vehicles
Armored personnel carriers: 100–300 new 6x6 APCs to replace current Sisu XA-188 and XA-180 models by 2030.
Self-propelled artillery
 36 K9 Thunders, of which 18 delivered by end of 2022 with the rest expected to arrive by 2026 at the latest.
Anti-tank systems
 Spike ~ 18 LR launchers to be delivered in 2021.

References

External links 
 Estonian Land Forces
 Estonian Ministry of Defence
 Estonian Land Forces Insignia